A Scandal in Paris is a 1946 American biographical film directed by Douglas Sirk and starring George Sanders, Signe Hasso and Carole Landis. It loosely depicts the life of Eugène François Vidocq, a French criminal who reformed and became a famous French Prefect of Police during the Napoleonic era.

Plot
The rogue (George Sanders) who would later call himself Eugène François Vidocq is born in a prison cell, the twelfth child of a woman who steals a loaf of bread each time she needs shelter to give birth. As the boy grows into a man, he is constantly in and out of jail. As the story begins, he and his cutpurse cellmate and associate, Emile Vernet (Akim Tamiroff), escape using a file hidden in a birthday cake provided by Vernet's aunt Ernestine (Gisela Werbisek).

While making their way to Paris, they are hired to pose for a painter (Fritz Leiber), Vidocq as Saint George and Vernet as the dragon. As the church painting nears completion, the pair steal the horse on which Vidocq is posing. In Paris, Uncle Hugo (Vladimir Sokoloff), the head of Vernet's criminal family, decides the safest place for the fugitives is in the army. He has a forger relative provide Vidocq with a fake commission as Lieutenant "Rousseau." While in Marseille, waiting to ship out to serve in Napoleon's campaign in Egypt, Vidocq encounters a singer named Loretta (Carole Landis). She is intrigued with him, while he is more attracted to her ruby garter. Accompanying her when she goes to meet her boring admirer Richet (Gene Lockhart), Vidocq manages to steal the garter.

After two years, Vidocq and Vernet leave the army. Returning to Paris, they make a detour around the church adorned by their likenesses. They come across the jewel-laden Marquise De Pierremont (Alma Kruger). Vidocq wrangles an invitation to her chateau after retrieving her pet monkey from a cemetery (where he also claims to be a relation of a Vidocq buried there). He is a bit alarmed when he discovers that his intended victim's son-in-law is the Minister of Police (Alan Napier), but also enchanted by the official's daughter Therese (Signe Hasso). Unbeknownst to him, she has fallen in love with the image of Saint George, and is greatly disturbed by the painting's uncanny resemblance to their guest. Vidocq and Vernet steal and hide the Marquise's jewels, intending to return for them later.

However, when the minister fires Richet, who is now his chief of police, for not recovering the jewels, Vidocq devises a much grander scheme. Through "deduction", he leads the minister to the hiding place of the jewels, and wins for himself Richet's old job. In that capacity, he gets Vernet's entire band of criminal relatives hired at the Bank of Paris, which he intends to rob.

A complication arises when he bumps into Loretta, who turns out to have married Richet. After learning his new identity, Loretta blackmails Vidocq into resuming their relationship. Vidocq tells Vernet to go ahead with the robbery that night. That day, he goes out walking with Therese and her younger sister Mimi. When they are alone, Therese informs him that she has figured out that he stole the jewels. However, she does not care. She is quite willing to follow him, even if it means embarking on a life of crime. Meanwhile, a jealous Richet bursts in on Loretta as his wife waits for Vidocq at a hat store. Richet threatens to kill himself. Instead, in a fit of anger brought on by Loretta's cold response, he shoots and kills her.

With that impediment out of the way, Vidocq informs Vernet's family that he has changed his mind; he will hunt them down if they go through with the robbery. Nearly everyone is content with their new jobs at the bank - except Vernet, who ambushes his former friend, forcing Vidocq to kill him. Vidocq confesses his past crimes to the minister and the Marquise. Because he has truly repented and changed, he is forgiven by all of the De Pierremonts and welcomed into the family as he marries Therese.

Cast

 George Sanders as Eugène François Vidocq
 Signe Hasso as Therese De Pierremont
 Carole Landis as Loretta
 Akim Tamiroff as Emile Vernet
 Gene Lockhart as Chief of Police Richet
 Alma Kruger as Marquise De Pierremont
 Alan Napier as Houdon De Pierremont
 Jo Ann Marlowe as Mimi De Pierremont
 Vladimir Sokoloff as Uncle Hugo
 Pedro de Cordoba as Priest
 Leona Maricle as Owner of Dress Shop
 Fritz Leiber as Painter
 Skelton Knaggs as Cousin Pierre
 Fred Nurney as Cousin Gabriel
 Gisela Werbisek as Aunt Ernestine (as Gisella Werbiseck)
 Marvin Davis as Little Louis
 Sam Harris as Stage Show Spectator (uncredited)
 Julius Tannen as Bank of Paris Manager (uncredited)

See also
Vidocq (1939)
Vidocq (2001)
The Emperor of Paris (2018)

References

External links
 
 
 
 

1946 films
1946 crime drama films
1946 romantic drama films
American biographical films
American black-and-white films
American crime drama films
American romantic drama films
American heist films
Films set in Paris
Films set in the 1800s
Films directed by Douglas Sirk
Films produced by Arnold Pressburger
1940s biographical films
Cultural depictions of Eugène François Vidocq
1940s English-language films
1940s American films